The 1998 World Junior Ice Hockey Championships (1998 WJHC) were held in Helsinki and Hämeenlinna, Finland. The championships began on December 25, 1997, and finished on January 3, 1998. Home team Finland was the winner, defeating Russia 2–1 in the gold medal game, thanks to the goaltending of Mika Noronen and the overtime heroics of Niklas Hagman. Switzerland defeated the Czech Republic 4–3 to capture the bronze medal, their first and only medal in the Ice Hockey World Junior Championship.

Canada had its five-year title streak broken with its worst placing to date (8th). Canada would miss out on gold seven years in a row before beginning their 2005–2009 streak of five straight championships. It was the only tournament from 1993 to 2012 in which Canada failed to medal.

This tournament attracted 139,680 fans to 34 games for an average of 4,108 per game. This set a record for the highest-attended World Junior tournament in Europe until the 2016 tournament, which was also held in Finland, attracted 215,225 spectators.

The playoff round was expanded to eight teams, with group leaders not getting a bye to the semifinals.

Championship results
All times are local. (Eastern European Time – UTC+2)

Pool A

Group A

Group B

Final round

Quarterfinals

Semifinals

Placement games

7th place game

5th place game

Bronze medal game

Gold medal game

Relegation round 

 lost the two game total goal series 17–3 and was relegated for the 1999 World Juniors

Final ranking

Scoring leaders

Tournament awards

Pool B 
The second tier was held in Sosnowiec and Tychy Poland, from December 28 to January 4.  Two groups of four played round robins, and then the top three played each of the top three teams from the other group.   All scores carried forward except the results against the lone eliminated team from each group.

Preliminary round 
Group A

Group B

Final round 

 was promoted to Pool A for 1999.

Relegation round 

 lost two games to one and was relegated to Pool C for 1999.

Pool C 
Played in Tallinn and Kohtla-Järve Estonia from December 28 to January 1.

Preliminary round 
Group A

Group B

Placement games 
7th place: 7 – 5 
5th place: 3 – 2 
3rd place: 4 – 2 
1st Place: 6 – 4 

Pool D 
Played in Kaunas and Elektrenai Lithuania from December 30 to January 3.

Preliminary round 
Group A

Group B

Placement games 
7th place: 11 – 0 
5th place: 6 – 4 
3rd place: 9 – 0 
1st Place: 6 – 3 

 was promoted to Pool C for 1999.

References

External links 
Statistics and results from Hockey Canada
http://www.passionhockey.com/hockeyarchives/U-20_1998.htm

World Junior Ice Hockey Championships
International sports competitions in Helsinki
World
1998
World Junior Ice Hockey Championships
World Junior Ice Hockey Championships
Sport in Hämeenlinna
1990s in Helsinki
World
Sosnowiec
Sport in Tychy
1997–98 in Estonian ice hockey
International ice hockey competitions hosted by Estonia
International ice hockey competitions hosted by Poland
Sports competitions in Tallinn
1990s in Tallinn
Sport in Kohtla-Järve